The 2014–15 season of the Oberliga Hamburg, the highest association football league in the German state of Hamburg, was the seventh season of the league at tier five (V) of the German football league system.

League table										
The 2014–15 season saw four new clubs in the league, FC Süderelbe, USC Paloma and Buxtehuder SV, all promoted from the Landesligas while SC Victoria Hamburg had been relegated from the Regionalliga Nord to the league.

League champions TuS Dassendorf declined to apply for a licence for the Regionalliga Nord. Runners-up SC Victoria Hamburg was granted a Regionalliga licence but later declined participation in the promotion round to the league. FC Elmshorn withdrew from the league during the season, in December 2014, and had its record expunged.

Top goalscorers
The top goal scorers for the season:

Promotion round
The two runners-up of the Landesliga divisions, Hammonia and Hansa, competed against each other for one more spot in the Oberliga for the following season:

|}

References

External links 
 Oberliga Hamburg on Fupa.net 

Oberliga Hamburg
Hamburg